Robert Samuel Bawlf (June 7, 1944 – August 20, 2016) was a Canadian politician and author.

Biography 
In 1972, Bawlf was elected to Victoria City Council, the youngest person ever to have been so. In 1975, he was elected to the Legislative Assembly of British Columbia for the riding of Victoria as a member of the Social Credit Party.  He was soon appointed Minister of Conservation and Recreation by Premier Bill Bennett.  As minister, he oversaw the enactment of B.C.’s first Heritage Conservation Act.  He was defeated in the 1979 general election.

Bawlf's book, The Secret Journey of Sir Francis Drake, was published in 2003 and has sold more than 20,000 copies. In it he challenged the conventional historical wisdom that fellow British explorer James Cook was the first European to visit the B.C. coast when he sailed into Nootka Sound in 1778 

He died of cancer on August 20, 2016.

References

1944 births
2016 deaths
20th-century Canadian legislators
21st-century Canadian historians
British Columbia Social Credit Party MLAs
Canadian urban planners
Conservation architects
Deaths from cancer in British Columbia
Members of the Executive Council of British Columbia
Politicians from Winnipeg
Real estate and property developers
Victoria, British Columbia city councillors